Hieracium pringlei, common name Pringle's hawkweed, is a North American plant species in the tribe Cichorieae within the family Asteraceae. It is native to Mexico with additional populations in Guatemala, Arizona, and New Mexico.

One stalk can produce 3-20 flower heads in a flat-topped array. Each head has 12-15 yellow ray flowers but no disc flowers.

References

pringlei
Flora of Guatemala
Flora of Mexico
Flora of the Southwestern United States
Plants described in 1883